Madison Kennedy (born December 22, 1987) is an American swimmer specializing in sprint freestyle currently representing DC Trident at the International Swimming League. She is a World Record holder in the 4×50 m freestyle relay. She won a gold medal at the 2015 US Nationals in the 50m freestyle, and silver in 2010 and 2011.  She has competed at the US Olympic Swimming Trials in 2008, 2012, and 2016. She won a silver medal at the 2015 Pan American Games, multiple relay medals at the 2014 SC World Championships, two gold medals at the 2009 World University Games. In 2016, she was the fastest swimmer in the Women's 50m freestyle during the prelims at the US Olympic Trials. She came into the trials that year as the top seed.

References

Living people
1987 births
American female freestyle swimmers
Medalists at the FINA World Swimming Championships (25 m)
Pan American Games bronze medalists for the United States
Pan American Games medalists in swimming
Universiade medalists in swimming
Swimmers at the 2011 Pan American Games
Swimmers at the 2019 Pan American Games
Universiade gold medalists for the United States
Medalists at the 2009 Summer Universiade
Medalists at the 2011 Pan American Games
Medalists at the 2019 Pan American Games
21st-century American women